Neal Lloyd First (October 8, 1930 – November 20, 2014) was an American biologist.

Birth and education 
Neal L. First was born in 1930. He completed his M.S. and Ph.D. at Michigan State University.

Research 

First was known for his contributions to animal genetics, and in particular for the development of systems of bovine embryo cloning, gene transfer, and in-vitro production of livestock embryos. His research helped to make major advances in the application of biotechnology to reproduction in farm animals possible, eliminating the need for brood cows in beef cattle breeding. His research focused on sperm and oocyte maturation, in vitro production of embryos, cloning of cattle, and methods for producing transgenic embryos.

Awards and honors 
Neal L. First received several awards. He received the Animal Science Morrison Award, the Upjohn Research Award, the Society for the Study of Reproduction Research Award, the National Association of Animal Breeders Research Award and the Von Humboldt Award. In 1996/7, he received the Wolf Prize in Agriculture "for his pioneering research in the reproductive biology of livestock". He was at the faculty of the University of Wisconsin–Madison when he received the prize.

He was also a member of the National Academy of Sciences.

Personal life 

First died on November 20, 2014 from cancer.

References

External links 

 
 R. Michael Roberts and John J. Parrish, "Neal L. First", Biographical Memoirs of the National Academy of Sciences (2016)

1930 births
2014 deaths
American biologists
Michigan State University alumni
University of Wisconsin–Madison faculty
Members of the United States National Academy of Sciences
Wolf Prize in Agriculture laureates